Frans Meijer  may refer to:

Frank Nicholas Meyer (1875–1918), born Frans Nicholaas Meijer in the Netherlands, American explorer and collector of plants
Frans Meijer, one of five Dutch men who were caught and imprisoned for the 1983 Kidnapping of Freddy Heineken